Isidro Mosquea Rodríguez (born 14 August 1976) is a boxer from the Dominican Republic.

He participated in the 2004 Summer Olympics for his native Caribbean country. There he was stopped in the first round of the Light welterweight (64 kg) division by Morocco's Hicham Nafil.

Mosquea won the silver medal in the same division one year earlier, at the Pan American Games in Santo Domingo.

External links
Yahoo! Sports

1976 births
Living people
Welterweight boxers
Boxers at the 2003 Pan American Games
Boxers at the 2004 Summer Olympics
Olympic boxers of the Dominican Republic
Dominican Republic male boxers
Pan American Games silver medalists for the Dominican Republic
Pan American Games medalists in boxing
Central American and Caribbean Games bronze medalists for the Dominican Republic
Competitors at the 1998 Central American and Caribbean Games
Competitors at the 2002 Central American and Caribbean Games
Central American and Caribbean Games medalists in boxing
Medalists at the 2003 Pan American Games
20th-century Dominican Republic people
21st-century Dominican Republic people